The 25th World Cup season began in August 1990 in New Zealand (for men only), resumed in December, and concluded in March 1991 in the United States.  The overall winners were Marc Girardelli of Luxembourg, his fourth title (the third man to reach that milestone) and Petra Kronberger of Austria (her second).  This was the first season following the reunification of Germany and the last before the dissolution of Yugoslavia.

During this season, the three men's races at Wengen were cancelled after the death of Gernot Reinstadler of Austria on January 18.  Reinstadler crashed during a training run for the downhill race, immediately above the finish line.

A break in the schedule was for the 1991 World Championships, held in Saalbach, Austria between January 22 and February 3, 1991.

Calendar

Men

Ladies

Men

Overall 

see complete table

In Men's Overall World Cup all results count. The parallel slalom only counts for the Nationscup (or was a show-event). Marc Girardelli won his fourth Overall World Cup.

Downhill 

see complete table

In 1991 all results count.

Super G 

see complete table

In 1991 all three results count.

Giant Slalom 

see complete table

In 1991 all results count.

Slalom 

see complete table

In 1991 all results count.

Combined 

see complete table

In 1991 only one competition was held.

Ladies

Overall 

see complete table

In Women's Overall World Cup all results count. The parallel slalom only counts for the Nationscup (or was a show-event).

Downhill 

see complete table

In Women's Downhill World Cup 1990/91 all results count.

Super G 

see complete table

In Women's Super G World Cup 1990/91 all results count. Carole Merle won her third Super G World Cup in a row.

Giant Slalom 

see complete table

In Women's Giant Slalom World Cup 1990/91 all results count. Vreni Schneider won her fourth Giant Slalom World Cup.

Slalom 

see complete table

In Women's Slalom World Cup 1990/91 all results count.

Combined 

see complete table

In Women's Combined World Cup 1990/91 both results count.

Nations Cup

Overall

Men

Ladies 

All points were shown. But without parallel slalom, because result ? (Also possible, that the parallel slalom was only a show-event.)

References

External links
FIS-ski.com - World Cup standings - 1991

FIS Alpine Ski World Cup
World Cup
World Cup